Bootham Park Hospital was a psychiatric hospital, located in the Bootham district of York, England. It was managed by the Tees, Esk and Wear Valleys NHS Foundation Trust. The main building is a Grade I listed building.

History

Construction and operation

In 1772, Robert Hay Drummond, the Archbishop of York, decided along with "twenty-four Yorkshire gentlemen" to establish an asylum, to be known as the "County Lunatic Asylum, York". A committee was established, and the architect John Carr was co-opted with a pledge of 25 guineas. Carr's patron, the Marquis of Rockingham, pledged 100 guineas, and a total of £2,500 was subscribed. By July 1773, £5,000 had been promised, and Carr's scheme to accommodate 54 patients was approved on 25 August.  The building was completed in 1777.

Following criticism about the handling of inmates at the asylum and the death of Hannah Mills, who was a Quaker, led the local Quaker community to found a new asylum known as The Retreat in 1790. The asylum became Bootham Park Hospital in 1904 and it joined the National Health Service in 1948.

Closure
In late September 2015 the hospital building was declared unfit by the Care Quality Commission, and ordered to close by the end of the month. Staff were given 5 days' notice to close the building. The hospital was closed on 1 October 2015, having been declared unfit for purpose. On the same day Tees, Esk and Wear Valleys NHS Foundation Trust replaced Leeds and York Partnership NHS Foundation Trust as the provider of most mental health services in York. Patients were transferred suddenly to other premises, some quite distant.

An independent report commissioned by City of York Council from John Ransford concluded:

The Vale of York Clinical Commissioning Group failed to ensure that the transfer was properly managed; 
Leeds & York Partnership NHS Foundation Trust had not properly taken responsibility for the building, although they spent £2.7 million on refurbishing the old building; 
If Tees, Esk and Wear Valleys NHS Foundation Trust failed to investigate the problems they would be sanctioned;
NHS Property Services significantly underestimated the logistic and practical challenges of upgrading a Grade I listed building where shortcomings had been identified over many years;
The Care Quality Commission gave insufficient attention to the particular issues raised by formal de-registration and registration of facilities, triggered by the transfer of services between agencies.

A smaller 24-bedded unit opened in 2016 replacing the 36 beds from Bootham Park Hospital. Outpatient clinics also reopened in February 2016. In April 2020 the hospital was being considered as a location where additional beds could be provided during the COVID-19 pandemic.

References

External links

Bootham Park Hospital Archive held at the Borthwick Institute for Archives, University of York
Hospital archives

Buildings and structures completed in 1777
Hospital buildings completed in the 18th century
Former psychiatric hospitals in England
Hospitals in York
Grade I listed buildings in York
1770s establishments in England
Defunct hospitals in England
Bootham